Alpha Phi Gamma may refer to:

 Alpha Phi Gamma (sorority), an Asian-interest sorority
 Alpha Phi Gamma (honor society) (with Pi Delta Epsilon), journalism honor societies that merged in 1975 to form the Society for Collegiate Journalists